The 2017–18 Serie A (known as the Serie A TIM for sponsorship reasons) was the 116th season of top-tier Italian football, the 86th in a round-robin tournament and the 8th since its organization under a league committee separate from Serie B. Juventus were the six-time defending champions. The season ran from 19 August 2017 to 20 May 2018.

On 13 May, Juventus won a record seventh consecutive title and 34rd title overall with one game remaining following their 0–0 draw with Roma.

The season was marred by the death of Davide Astori, the captain of Fiorentina, due to heart problems.

Events
On 13 May 2017, SPAL were mathematically promoted from Serie B after 49 years away. Five days later, Hellas Verona clinched promoted as well, one year on from being relegated. On 8 June 2017, Benevento won the promotion play-offs to earn the club a first ever promotion to Serie A; they became the 67th team to participate in the Italian top flight.

After video assistant refereeing (VAR) was privately tested in the previous season, on 10 June 2017 it was announced replay assistance would be implemented for this season. The percentage of errors in Serie A in this season was reportedly 0.89 percent, compared to 5.78 percent if VAR had not been not used.

Subsequently to the new UEFA entry criteria, Italy obtained four group stage spots for the following Champions League season, as did the other three leagues with the highest coefficient in Europe; this was an improvement on the three Champions League spots (two group stage places and one qualifying play-off place) that Serie A had received prior.

On 4 March 2018, Davide Astori, captain of Fiorentina, died in his sleep while staying in a hotel in Udine prior to Fiorentina's match against Udinese, proven to be caused by cardiac arrest determined from an autopsy conducted two days later. All Serie A, Serie B and Serie C matches scheduled for 4 March were postponed. Cagliari and Fiorentina both retired the number 13 jersey worn by Astori in his honour.

The teams that were relegated included Benevento (on 22 April 2018, after one year in Serie A), Hellas Verona (on 5 May 2018, also after one year), and Crotone (on 20 May 2018, after two seasons in the top flight).

On 13 May 2018, Juventus won their seventh title in a row and the 34th in their history following their 0–0 draw away to Roma in the penultimate matchweek. Four days later, Juventus goalkeeper Gianluigi Buffon announced his farewell to Serie A (and the national football team). He left the league after 23 career seasons, the last seventeen being with Juventus, having earned nine league titles and 640 caps, the second highest ever in Serie A. However, after a year away with Paris Saint-Germain, Buffon would return to Juventus and to Serie A for the 2019–20 season.

Teams

Stadiums and locations

Personnel and kits

Managerial changes

League table

Results

Season statistics

Top goalscorers

Hat-tricks

Note
4 Player scored four goals ; (H) – Home  (A) – Away

Clean sheets

Attendances

Number of teams by region

References

External links

 Official website

Serie A seasons
Italy
1